INJAZ (Arabic: إنجاز) is a non-profit organization founded in 1999 in the Hashemite Kingdom of Jordan. Its primary objective is youth development, with a focus on enhancing young people's skills in four key areas: Financial Education, Life Skills, Business and Entrepreneurship, and Employment. INJAZ provides programs to help young people acquire these skills and collaborates with private and public sector organizations to deliver them. Through these efforts, INJAZ has helped countless young individuals in Jordan develop their abilities and reach their full potential.

History
Sponsored by Queen Rania, INJAZ was established in 1999 as a project under the United States Agency for International Development (USAID) funded organization Save the Children. In the early stages the project encountered opposition, notably in Ma'an; it was re-launched in 2001 by Soraya Salti as an independent non-profit. Its activities reached over 100,000 school students in Jordan during the 2010–11 academic year.

Its aim is to meet a perceived need for vocational training, providing young people with entrepreneurship skills and enhancing their employability. The program has been funded in part by the business sector, and involves volunteers from private business in delivering the training.

It implements over 44 programs throughout Jordan's 12 governorates, in close collaboration with 3000 schools, 41 universities/colleges, and 50 youth centers.

Volunteerism
INJAZ has a platform to set up volunteer services.

INJAZ already succeeded in institutionalizing volunteerism within the corporate social responsibility (CSR) programs, which have been already adopted by many of its over-300 private and public sector partners.

Organization
INJAZ is headquartered in Amman, Jordan with field offices in Irbid, Zarqa, Karak, Wadi Musa, Tafilah and Aqaba.

References

Non-profit organisations based in Jordan
Organizations established in 1999
Educational organisations based in Jordan
Child-related organisations in Jordan
1999 establishments in Jordan